Shigefumi Hino (日野 重文 Hino Shigefumi, born 1963) is a Japanese graphics designer, game director and planner from Nintendo. He is the creator of Yoshi from the Yoshi franchise. Hino later served as the director of the Pikmin series, alongside Masamichi Abe.

Career
Shigefumi Hino joined Nintendo in 1989, where his first project was designing a sequel to Famicom Grand Prix: F1 Race, which was ultimately unreleased. His first released product was Super Mario World in 1990, where he created the game's pixel art, as well as the character Yoshi, based on a rough sketch by Takashi Tezuka. Afterwards, Hino had the idea for a game with Yoshi as the main character, which would become Yoshi's Island. He chose a hand-drawn visual style to differentiate it from Rare's Donkey Kong Country, a game that notably used pre-rendered 3D graphics.

Hino then co-directed Pikmin and Pikmin 2 with  Masamichi Abe, as well as Pikmin 3 with Yuji Kando. He has additionally worked as a designer for Super Mario Maker and Super Mario Maker 2.

Works
Super Mario World (1990) – Character designer
Yoshi's Cookie (1992) – Character designer
The Legend of Zelda: Link's Awakening (1993) – Character designer
Super Mario World 2: Yoshi's Island (1995) – Director, character designer
Super Mario 64 (1996) – CG illustrator
Tetris Attack (1996) – Design adviser
Mario Kart 64 (1996) – CG character designer
Game & Watch Gallery 2 (1997) – Design adviser
Yoshi's Story (1997) – CG designer
Pokémon Stadium (JP, 1998) – Effects designer
Mario Party (1998) – Design support
Game & Watch Gallery 3 (1999) – Design adviser
Pokémon Stadium (1999) – 2D CG designer
Pikmin (2001) – Director (with Masamichi Abe)
Pikmin 2 (2004) – Director (with Masamichi Abe)
New Super Mario Bros. (2006) – Demo scene director
Big Brain Academy: Wii Degree (2007) – Sub-director
New Super Mario Bros. Wii (2009) – Planning
Pikmin 3 (2013) – Director (with Yuji Kando)
Super Mario Maker (2015) – Planning (with Arisa Hosaka)
Super Mario Maker for Nintendo 3DS (2016) - Game design
Super Smash Bros. Ultimate (2018) - Original game supervisor
Super Mario Maker 2 (2019) - Game design

References 

1963 births
Japanese video game designers
Japanese video game directors
Living people
Nintendo people